Lake Owyhee State Park is a state park in the U.S. state of Oregon, administered by the Oregon Parks and Recreation Department. Bighorn sheep can be found here.

See also
 List of Oregon state parks

References

External links
 

State parks of Oregon
Parks in Malheur County, Oregon